Alive is the 1969 album from The Nitty Gritty Dirt Band. Liberty Records released this album after the original version of the band broke up and before the next version of the band re-signed with them. John McEuen would later recall that "we did [the album] at the Troubador and there were mountains of equipment on stage because Poco were on the same bill with us." Given McEuen's comment, it appears that the documented performance occurred on either December 6 or 7, 1968. The band would break up within weeks of this show.

Reception

The Allmusic review by Bruce Eder awarded the album 4 stars stating "How many live albums -- forget decent ones -- were left behind by bands in 1967/68? This is one, and it's better than decent, and almost a gift from heaven, capturing an early incarnation of the group (circa 1967) on a good night at the L.A. Troubadour. Someone has earned a place in musical heaven for seeing to recording the show.".

Track listing
 "Crazy Words, Crazy Tune" (Jack Yellen, Milton Ager) – 1:39
 "Buy for Me the Rain" (Steve Noonan, Greg Copeland) – 3:12
 "Candy Man" (Rev. Gary Davis) – 2:36
 "Foggy Mountain Breakdown" (Earl Scruggs) – 5:04
 "Rock Me Baby" (B.B. King, Jules Taub) – 5:51
 "Fat Boys (Can Make It in Santa Monica)" (Jeff Hanna, Chris Darrow) – 1:41
 "Alligator Man" (Floyd Chance, Jimmy C. Newman) – 3:43
 "Crazy Words, Crazy Tune" (Jack Yellen, Milton Ager) – 3:48
 "Goodnight, My Love, Pleasant Dreams" (George Motola, John Marascalco) – 10:11

Personnel
 Ralph Barr – guitar, kazoo, lead vocals on "Crazy Words, Crazy Tune"
 John McEuen – banjo, piano, accordion, tambourine
 Jeff Hanna – rhythm guitar, washboard, harmonica, drums, lead vocals
 Jimmie Fadden – drums, harmonica, washtub bass, jug, lead vocals on "Rock Me Baby"
 Les Thompson – bass
 Chris Darrow – fiddle, mandolin, lead vocals on "Alligator Man" and "Goodnight, My Love, Pleasant Dreams"

About The Songs
Crazy Words, Crazy Tune is not significantly different from the version on their first album.

Buy For Me The Rain is introduced by Jeff Hanna. He makes a few jokes about how fleeting was the fame of this hit record from their first album.

Candy Man is also from their first album and is close to that version.

Foggy Mountain Breakdown is a banjo instrumental played by John McEuen. He pulls a false start for laughs. It is introduced by Jeff Hanna with a long story about how John won the King O Da Banjo contest.

Rock Me Baby is a B. B. King blues song originally released in 1964. This version was dedicated by the band to a couple celebrating their first anniversary. It starts with harmonica for 16 bars, and then joined by electric guitar for 16 more. Vocals are bluesy. Piano comes in later.

Fat Boys (Can Make It In Santa Monica) is a silly song written by band members Jeff Hanna and Chris Darrow. They both sing and play acoustic guitar. The lyric implies that the girls in Santa Monica are not picky. The title is given as Fat Boys (Can't Make It In Santa Monica) on a British CD release.

Alligator Man was written by Floyd Chance in 1962. It has an upbeat Cajun feel, featuring harmonica, accordion, and fiddle. The lyrics are the Alligator Man describing his life in the bayou hunting alligators. While introducing the song, Jeff talks about spending the summer of 1968 filming "Paint Your Wagon".

Crazy Words, Crazy Tune is sung in slow motion this time for laughs.

Goodnight, My Love, Pleasant Dreams was written by John Marascalco and George Motola in 1956 and originally released by Jesse Belvin the same year. It is a romantic ballad in a 50s style. It is introduced with a long, humorous description of young people in the 50s.

Production
 Producer – Dallas Smith

Discography
Nitty Gritty Dirt Band discography

References
All information is from album liner notes, unless otherwise noted.

Nitty Gritty Dirt Band albums
1969 live albums
Liberty Records albums
Country rock albums by American artists
Folk rock albums by American artists
Bluegrass albums